Cyclopentadienylmolybdenum tricarbonyl dimer is the chemical compound with the formula Cp2Mo2(CO)6, where Cp is C5H5.  A dark red solid, it has been the subject of much research although it has no practical uses.

Structure and synthesis
The molecule exists in two rotamers, gauche and anti. The six CO ligands are terminal and the Mo-Mo bond distance is 3.2325 Å. The compound is prepared by treatment of molybdenum hexacarbonyl with sodium cyclopentadienide followed by oxidation of the resulting NaMo(CO)3(C5H5). Other methods have been developed starting with Mo(CO)3(CH3CN)3 instead of Mo(CO)6.

Reactions
Thermolysis of this compound in hot solution of diglyme (bis(2-methoxyethyl)ether) results in decarbonylation, giving the tetracarbonyl, which has a formal triple bond between the Mo centers (dMoMo = 2.448 Å):
(C5H5)2Mo2(CO)6  →  (C5H5)2Mo2(CO)4 +  2 CO
The resulting cyclopentadienylmolybdenum dicarbonyl dimer in turn binds a variety of substrates across the metal-metal triple bond.

Related compounds
 Cyclopentadienyltungsten tricarbonyl dimer
 Cyclopentadienylchromium tricarbonyl dimer

References

Organomolybdenum compounds
Carbonyl complexes
Dimers (chemistry)
Half sandwich compounds
Cyclopentadienyl complexes
Chemical compounds containing metal–metal bonds